RRS may stand for:

 Racing Rules of Sailing, a set of rules governing the conduct of yacht racing, windsurfing and many other forms of racing with wind-powered vessels
 Railroad Station, see Train Station
 Rapid Response Services, a humanitarian logistics service operating in Darfur
 Rational Response Squad
 Reaction Research Society
 Red River Shootout, an annual football game between University of Texas and University of Oklahoma
 Relative rate of spoilage, a mathematical model used to predict the shelf life of some food products
 Rentsys Recovery Services, a provider of Disaster Recovery and Business Continuity Solutions
 Resource Recovery Services (z/OS feature)
 Reutech Radar Systems
 Royal Regiment of Scotland
 Royal Research Ship
 Ryan Rowland-Smith, baseball player
 The IATA airport code for Røros Airport
 Realistic Robot Simulation, a joint project between robot manufacturers and suppliers of robot simulation software
 Reconfigurable Radio Systems, a generic concept based on wireless technologies